Elections to Cookstown District Council were held on 7 June 2001 on the same day as the other Northern Irish local government elections. The election used three district electoral areas to elect a total of 16 councillors.

Election results

Note: "Votes" are the first preference votes.

Districts summary

|- class="unsortable" align="centre"
!rowspan=2 align="left"|Ward
! % 
!Cllrs
! % 
!Cllrs
! %
!Cllrs
! %
!Cllrs
! % 
!Cllrs
!rowspan=2|TotalCllrs
|- class="unsortable" align="center"
!colspan=2 bgcolor="" | Sinn Féin
!colspan=2 bgcolor="" | SDLP
!colspan=2 bgcolor="" | UUP
!colspan=2 bgcolor="" | DUP
!colspan=2 bgcolor="white"| Others
|-
|align="left"|Ballinderry
|30.0
|2
|bgcolor="#99FF66"|32.5
|bgcolor="#99FF66"|2
|17.2
|1
|20.3
|1
|0.0
|0
|6
|-
|align="left"|Cookstown Central
|bgcolor="#008800"|31.7
|bgcolor="#008800"|2
|19.8
|1
|27.6
|1
|20.9
|1
|0.0
|0
|5
|-
|align="left"|Drum Manor
|bgcolor="#008800"|39.0
|bgcolor="#008800"|2
|15.6
|1
|19.8
|1
|13.4
|0
|12.2
|1
|5
|- class="unsortable" class="sortbottom" style="background:#C9C9C9"
|align="left"| Total
|33.2
|6
|23.6
|4
|21.1
|3
|18.4
|2
|3.7
|1
|16
|-
|}

District results

Ballinderry

1997: 2 x SDLP, 2 x Sinn Féin, 1 x DUP, 1 x UUP
2001: 2 x SDLP, 2 x Sinn Féin, 1 x DUP, 1 x UUP
1997-2001 Change: No change

Cookstown Central

1997: 2 x UUP, 1 x Sinn Féin, 1 x SDLP, 1 x DUP
2001: 2 x Sinn Féin, 1 x UUP, 1 x SDLP, 1 x DUP
1997-2001 Change: Sinn Féin gain from UUP

Drum Manor

1997: 2 x Sinn Féin, 1 x UUP, 1 x SDLP, 1 x Independent Unionist
2001: 2 x Sinn Féin, 1 x UUP, 1 x SDLP, 1 x Independent
1997-2001 Change: Independent Unionist becomes Independent

References

Cookstown District Council elections
Cookstown